H. aspersa  may refer to:
 Helix aspersa (now classified as Cornu aspersum), the garden snail, a pulmonate gastropod species
 Hogna aspersa, a large wolf spider species found in the United States
 Hyposmocoma aspersa, a moth species endemic to Oahu

See also
 Aspersa